Michele Gazzara (born 27 September 1990) is an Italian cyclist, who last rode for UCI Continental team .

Major results

2010
 1st Stage 1 Giro Ciclistico Della Valle D'aosta Mont Blanc
2011
 1st Trofeo Città di San Vendemiano
2012
 7th GP Capodarco
 10th Gran Premio di Poggiana
2014
 1st Trofeo Alcide Degasperi
 10th Overall Giro del Friuli-Venezia Giulia
2015
 1st Giro del Medio Brenta
 1st Trofeo Internazionale Bastianelli
2016
 2nd Overall CCC Tour-Grodów Piastowskich
 4th Giro del Medio Brenta
2017
 1st Giro del Medio Brenta
 3rd Overall Tour of Albania
 7th Coppa della Pace
2018
 1st  Overall Tour of Albania
1st Stage 1
 6th Overall Sibiu Cycling Tour
 10th Gran Premio di Lugano

References

External links

1990 births
Living people
Italian male cyclists
People from Syracuse, Sicily
Sportspeople from the Province of Syracuse
Cyclists from Sicily